Alder is a census-designated place (CDP) in Madison County, Montana, United States. The population was 86 at the 2020 census. The community takes its name from Alder Creek (named by Henry Edgar in 1863), the site of the second major gold discovery in Montana.

Geography
Alder is located at  (45.324531, -112.108035). Montana Highway 287 passes through town. Ruby Reservoir is to the south.

Climate
This climatic region is typified by large seasonal temperature differences, with warm to hot (and often humid) summers and cold (sometimes severely cold) winters.  According to the Köppen Climate Classification system, Alder has a humid continental climate, abbreviated "Dfb" on climate maps.

Demographics

As of the census of 2000, there were 116 people, 48 households, and 25 families residing in the CDP. The population density was 57.6 people per square mile (22.3/km). There were 69 housing units at an average density of 34.3 per square mile (13.3/km). The racial makeup of the CDP was 100.00% White.

There were 48 households, out of which 27.1% had children under the age of 18 living with them, 45.8% were married couples living together, 4.2% had a female householder with no husband present, and 47.9% were non-families. 33.3% of all households were made up of individuals, and 16.7% had someone living alone who was 65 years of age or older. The average household size was 2.42 and the average family size was 3.44.

In the CDP, the population was spread out, with 26.7% under the age of 18, 6.0% from 18 to 24, 27.6% from 25 to 44, 27.6% from 45 to 64, and 12.1% who were 65 years of age or older. The median age was 38 years. For every 100 females, there were 110.9 males. For every 100 females age 18 and over, there were 107.3 males.

The median income for a household in the CDP was $26,458, and the median income for a family was $33,750. Males had a median income of $22,500 versus $30,000 for females. The per capita income for the CDP was $16,300. There were no families and 1.8% of the population living below the poverty line, including no under eighteens and none of those over 64.

In popular culture
Alder is mentioned in the song "Myrna Loy", by American songwriter Josh Ritter, from his 2017 album Gathering.

Alder is the setting for the western romance novel Desperate Hearts by Roseanne Bittner.

See also

 List of census-designated places in Montana

References

External links

Census-designated places in Madison County, Montana
Census-designated places in Montana